In shogi, Tempo Loss Bishop Exchange or One-Move-Loss Bishop Exchange or Bishop Exchange With Tempo Loss (一手損角換わり ittezon kakugawari) is a Bishop Exchange (Static Rook) opening that has White trading the bishops very early in the game before Black's bishop moves up to the 77 square.

Overview

The Tempo Loss Bishop Exchange opening was developed by retired player Hitoshige Awaji 9-dan for which he was awarded the prestigious Masuda award in 2006.  This opening became popular among professional players around 2004 and was even played in two of the seven matches for the title of Meijin between Toshiyuki Moriuchi and Yoshiharu Habu in 2005.

Before the emergence of the Tempo Loss Bishop Exchange, some professional players had considered that Bishop Exchange openings led White to be pushed into defensive positions and to be unable to launch more powerful attacks, hence reducing the amount of possibilities available to the White player. Since the Tempo Loss variations of Bishop Exchange prevents White from being pushed to the defensive, this new strategy was quite revolutionary. 

In the Bishop Exchange opening game, White typically skips pushing their rook pawn to the middle rank (...P-85) and instead trades the bishops off the board early to place them in hand. Before the development of the Tempo Loss variants, no strategy had been developed to follow the tempo loss for White involving the rook file. Specifically, after the tempo loss instead of White advancing the pawn to ...P-85, the strategy developed so as to leave the pawn at P-84, so that the knight can jump to the 85 square if necessary (both for attack purposes and for defense, in case the knight's head on 73 is attacked). This is the gist of the Tempo Loss strategy. Three variants have been developed involving Reclining Silver, Climbing Silver, and Rushing Silver.

Reclining Silver

This position is almost identical to Bishop Exchange, Reclining Silver, but by keeping the pawn at 8d rather than advancing it to 8e a number of attack possibilities involving the knight on 73 are created. Although compared to the traditional P-85 formation White is not actually gaining a tempo in this case, insofar as the possibility of moving expands, this makes it easier to protect against Black's taking unilateral control of the game.

Climbing Silver

Following the bishop exchange, it is natural for Black to try to take advantage of White's tempo loss with the fast Climbing Silver strategy (which has Black's right silver advanced to the 25 square usually aiming for an edge attack by sacrificing the silver).

See also

 Bishop Exchange
 Bishop Exchange Reclining Silver
 Bishop Exchange Climbing Silver
 Bishop Exchange Rushing Silver
 Wrong Diagonal Bishop Exchange
 Static Rook

Bibliography

External links

 HIDETCHI's YouTube videos: Bishop Exchange #4 (Tempo Loss Bishop Exchange)
 Yamajunn's Shogi Opening Traps:
 Hayakuri Gin In Ittezon Kakugawari Part 1
 Hayakuri Gin In Ittezon Kakugawari Part 2
 Yet Another Shogi Site: Tempo Loss Bishop Exchange: Double Reclining Silver
 Yoshiharu Habu and Modern Shogi: 
 Chapter 2: Yasumitsu Sato's Maverick Brain · Commentary on the Kisei-title match
 Chapter 5: A Piece of Art, Born in Paris · Commentary on the Ryuoh Title Match
 Lectures on the Latest Strategies: Lecture 1: Tempo Loss Bishop Exchange
 2014 October 30 Ryūō Tournament · Toshiyuki Moriuchi vs Tetsurō Itodani · Tempo Loss Bishop Exchange, Climbing Silver variation

Shogi openings
Bishop Exchange openings